John Hamill (born 3 May 1947) is an English actor.

He had previously attended the Elliott School, Putney from 1958 to 1962 before becoming a bodybuilder and one of Britain's most popular "physique models" in the late 1960s before turning to acting, studying at the Webber Douglas Academy of Dramatic Art, and appearing in the stage farce There's a Girl in My Soup.

Hamill's background as a physique model, which included cover appearances on several beefcake publications and the occasional 8 mm 'posing strap' film, earned him a considerable gay following, which is still visible on the internet today. It would also prove good training for his later nude appearances in David Grant's sex films and nudity ridden horror titles like Tower of Evil (1972), in which Hamill's role is synopsized by The Bare Facts Video Guide as "Buns, walking with Penny, then more buns, rolling into the water, dead". He also appeared as artist Alan Street opposite Sue Longhurst in a trilogy of British sex comedies, comprising The Over-Amorous Artist (1974), Girls Come First (1975) and Under the Bed (1977).

Hamill's other film appearances included Trog (1970), No Blade of Grass (1970), Travels with My Aunt (1972) and Hardcore (1977).

Television appearances included: Crossroads, The Shadow of the Tower, Space: 1999, The Venturers, 1990, Doctor Who (in the serial The Ribos Operation), Dennis Potter's play Double Dare, and The Professionals. He left acting in the late 1980s. His last known TV appearance was in an episode of The Bill in 1989.

Selected filmography 
 A Dandy in Aspic (1968) – uncredited
 Every Home Should Have One (1970) as Porridge Eater #1
 The Beast in the Cellar (1970) as Alan Marlow
 Trog (1970) as Cliff
 No Blade of Grass (1970) as Roger Burnham
 Tower of Evil (1972) as Gary
 Travels with My Aunt (1972) as Crowder's Man
 The National Health (1973) as Kenny
 The Over-Amorous Artist (1974) as Alan Street
 Girls Come First (1975) as Alan Street
 Under the Bed (1977) as Alan Street
 Hardcore (1977) as Daniel
 Mannen i skuggan (1978) as Dan

See also 
 Sue Longhurst
 Heather Deeley
 Fiona Richmond
 Hazel O'Connor

References 
Citations

Further reading
 Keeping the British End Up: Four Decades of Saucy Cinema by Simon Sheridan (fourth edition) (Titan Publishing, London) (2011)

External links 
 

1947 births
Living people
English male film actors
English male television actors
People from Shepherd's Bush
Male actors from London